Certificated bailiffs were employees by private companies empowered to enforce a variety of debts on behalf of organisations such as local authorities. They were abolished in 2014, when they were replaced with certificated enforcement agents.

Powers
They could seize and sell goods to cover the amount of the debt owed. They also held a certificate, which enabled them, and them alone, to levy distress for rent, road traffic debts, council tax and non-domestic rates. They could not enforce the collection of money due under orders of the High Court or the County Court.

See also
 Bailiff

External links
Ministry of Justice Website
I blocked a bailiff - and paid the price

Law enforcement occupations in the United Kingdom